DECC may refer to:

 Department of Energy and Climate Change, United Kingdom
 Department of Environment, Climate Change and Water (New South Wales), formerly Department of Environment and Climate Change
 Duluth Entertainment Convention Center